The Pass-a-Grille Historic District (also known as Old Town of Pass-a-Grille) is a U.S. historic district (designated as such on October 19, 1989) located in the town of Pass-a-Grille at the southern end of St. Pete Beach, Pinellas County, Florida. The district is bounded by 12th Avenue, Gulf Boulevard, 4th Avenue, and Gulf Avenue. It contains 97 historic buildings.

On September 15, 2003, the area was expanded to include an area bounded by Pass-a-Grille Way, 1st Avenue, Gulf Way, Sunset Way, and 32nd Avenue. The new area contained contains 354 more historic buildings.

The Gulf Beaches Historical Museum is a museum of local history that is located in the district in the former Pass-a-Grille Community Church.

History

References

External links

 Pinellas County listings at National Register of Historic Places
 Gulf Beaches Historical Museum - official site

National Register of Historic Places in Pinellas County, Florida
Historic districts on the National Register of Historic Places in Florida